Guillermo Álvarez Macías (16 October 1919 - 18 December 1976) was a Mexican general manager of the co-operative cement company Cemento Cruz Azul from 1955 until his death in 1976. Álvarez Macías led the company's re-foundation into a cooperative company town. A prolific cooperative activist, Álvarez Macías is regarded as a prominent figure of modern cooperatives in Mexico.

While acting as general manager of Cemento Cruz Azul, Álvarez Macías, campaigned to establish the company's association football team, Cruz Azul, into a professional club where the players would have a considerable amount of control of the team's structure. He achieved this goal in 1961. The club managed to reach the top division in 1964. During his tenure as club chairman, Cruz Azul dominated the league, winning 5 national titles. Cruz Azul has since become one of the most popular football clubs in Mexico and the rapid rise to prominence in Mexican football is widely attributed to Álvarez Macías.

Early life
Álvarez Macías was born to José Álvarez Roaro and Emilia Macías de Álvarez in Cortazar, Guanajuato on October 16, 1919. His family emigrated to Jasso, Hidalgo in 1924. From a very young age, Álvarez Macías was employed at Cemento Cruz Azul as a vehicle mechanic.

Cemento Cruz Azul
On January 12, 1937, Álvarez Macías became an associate with the cooperative while holding the title of warehouse dispatcher.

Álvarez Macías led the company's re-construction into a cooperative company town which was established on December 10, 1953. In 1955 he was appointed as general manager of the cooperative. The reconstruction project created schools, paved streets, built restaurants, movie theaters, sport stadiums and fields. In addition, forms mutual insurance were established in order to enable the development of the communities in surrounding the cement plants. Álvarez Macías's philosophy was to promote social progress by sharing economic growth in order to raise the standard of living of workers and his own family.

During his tenure at Cemento Cruz Azul, he established 5 other similar cooperatives in Hidalgo and in Lagunas, Oaxaca, where the company also had a cement factory.

Cruz Azul

After being appointed as general manager of Cemento Cruz Azul, Álvarez Macías heavily invested in the company's association football team in order to ensure the social, cultural, and sports development of workers and their families. The manner in which the club conducted was described to be similar to Corinthians Democracy, with matters of the club being voted on by the worker-players which included their salaries, the length and duration of training sessions, transfers, and even head managers.

Following the club's promotion, Estadio 10 de Diciembre underwent renovations on March 6, 1964, rebuilding the wooden stands and dressing rooms. The club won its first national title in the season of 1968–1969, and under the presidency of Macías the club would achieve four more.

Personal life
Álvarez Macías married María del Carmen Cuevas Saldaña in 1942, with whom he had 4 children: María del Carmen,  María Gilda, Guillermo and Alfredo.

Death
On December 18, 1976, Álvarez Macías, along with numerous local politicians, was to meet with the newly elected president of Mexico, José López Portillo, at the Endhó Dam located on the Tula River to discuss and survey the area for a planned agricultural experimental unit for food production. While waiting for Portillo, Álvarez Macías suffered a heart attack and died.

References

1919 births
1976 deaths
Mexican socialists
Cooperative organizers